Wilson Markle (born  September 2, 1938) is a Canadian engineer who invented the film colorization process in 1970. His first company, Image Transform, colored pictures from the Apollo space program to make a full-color television presentation for NASA.

His method used computers to assign predetermined colors to shades of gray in each scene.

In 1983, he founded Colorization Inc., which was co-owned by Hal Roach Studios and International HRS Industries. The word "colorization" later became a generic name.

Patents 

An application for the first patent on the process was made by Colorization Inc. on 11 July 1983, listing Wilson Markle and Christopher Mitchell as inventors. It was issued on 1 December 1987 (US Patent 4710805).

References 

1938 births
Living people
Canadian engineers